The third edition of the Champs-Élysées Film Festival was held from 11 to 17 June 2014, with actors Jacqueline Bisset and Bertrand Tavernier as Honorary Presidents and Keanu Reeves, Agnès Varda, Whit Stillman and Mike Figgis as Guests of Honor. More than 120,000 people attended the Festival, with more than 110 films screened. Ronit Elkabetz and Shlomi Elkabetz's Gett: The Trial of Viviane Amsalem was shown at the Closing Ceremony. Along with its competitive Official Selections for American feature-length films, American Shorts and French Shorts, the Festival presented a wide selection of important American and French movie premieres, the TCM Cinema Essentials, a thirteen-film selection of American classics, and the Great French Classics, a five-film selection. Both Honorary Presidents held masterclasses, and the Guests of Honor presented each a selection of their respective filmographies. Three Audience Prizes (Best American Feature-Length Film, Best American Short Film, Best French Short Film), a Bloggers Jury Award (Best American Feature-Length Film) and a Youth Jury Award (Favorite Film in the TCM Cinema Essentials Selection) were presented during the Closing Ceremony, held at the Publicis Cinema. Along with the US in Progress program, a new event targeted at industry professionals was held alongside the Festival: titled Paris Coproduction Village it brought together 12 international feature film projects in development looking for French and European partners, as well as 6 projects from the Cannes Film Festival Cinefondation Residence.

Official Selection

American Independent Feature-Length Films

 1982, directed by Tommy Oliver
 American Promise, directed by Michèle Stephenson & Joe Brewster
 Fort Bliss, directed by Claudia Myers
 Obvious Child, directed by Gillian Robespierre
 Rich Hill, directed by Tracy Droz Tragos & Andrew Droz Palermo
 See You Next Tuesday, directed by Drew Tobia
 Summer Of Blood, directed by Onur Tukel
 Sun Belt Express directed by Evan Buxbaum

Short films

The Official Selection of Short Films comprises more than 30 films, which were selected by a French industry team as well as four major film school programs: University of Southern California’s School of Cinematic Arts, AFI and Columbia University’s Columbia University Film Festival for the United States and Paris-based film schools La Femis, Les Gobelins, EICAR and ARTFX for France.

French Shorts Competitive Selection

French Shorts Selection
 As it used to be, directed by Clément Gonzalez
 J'aime beaucoup ta mère, directed by Rémy Four & Julien War
 La curée, directed by Emmanuel Fricero
 La queue, directed by Yacine Sersar
 Le ballon rouge, directed by Sylvain Bressollette
 Vos violences, directed by Antoine Raimbault
 Personne(s), directed by Marc Fouchard
 Passé composé, directed by Ted Hardy-Carnac
 Tu te souviens ?, directed by Virginie Schwartz

La Femis Shorts Selection
 I don't like to be lonely, directed by Joseph Minster
 Shopping, directed by Vladilen Vierny

Les Gobelins Shorts Selection
 Floating in my mind, directed by Hélène Leroux
 Fol'Amor, directed by Marthe Delaporte
 Meet Meat, directed by Eve Guastella
 Myosis, directed by Emmanuel Asquier-Brassart
 Spotted, directed by Yoann Bomal

ArtFX Shorts Selection
 Atome, directed by Adrien Cappai
 Catch a lot, directed by Yohann Clément
 La grotte dans l'île avec le trésor à l'intérieur, directed by François Audagiori

EICAR Shorts Selection
 Deuxième étage, directed by Natali Soledad Blanco

American Shorts Competitive Selection

American Shorts Selection
 Amma, directed by Pravin Chottera
 Insomniacs, directed by Charles Chintzer Lai
 Rat Pack Rat, directed by Todd Rohal
 Red, directed by Channing Godfrey Peoples
 The Coin, directed by Fabien Martorell
 Yearbook, directed by Bernardo Britto

USC School of Cinematic Arts Shorts Selection
 A Different Tree, directed by Steven Caple Jr.
 In Passing, directed by Alan Miller
 Matchbox, directed by Ali Kareem

AFI
 Bamidbar, directed by Onn Nir
 The Divide, directed by Ashley Monti

Columbia University Film Festival Shorts Selection
 Aftermath, directed by Jeremy Robbins
 Total Freak, directed by Andrew Ellmaker

US in Progress Official Selection
 Automatic At Sea, directed by Matthew Lessner
 Creative Control directed by Benjamin Dickinson
 Eugenia and John directed by Hossein Keshavarz
 Winning Dad, directed by Arthur Allen

Awards
Audience Prizes
 Best American Independent Feature-Length Film: Fort Bliss, directed by Claudia Myers
 Best American Short Film: The Coin, directed by Fabien Martorell
 Best French Short Film: La curée, directed by Emmanuel Fricero

Bloggers Jury Award
 Best American Independent Feature-Length Film: American Promise, directed by Michèle Stephenson & Joe Brewster

Youth Jury Award
 Favorite TCM Cinema Essentials classic movie: The Incident, directed by Larry Peerce

US in Progress
 US in Progress Paris Award: Creative Control directed by Benjamin Dickinson

Festival theaters
 Le Balzac
 Gaumont Champs-Élysées
 Le Lincoln
 MK2 Grand-Palais
 Publicis Cinéma
 UGC George V

References

External links 
 Champs-Élysées Film Festival official website
 US in Progress official website
 Paris Coproduction Village official website

Champs-Élysées Film Festival
2014 in Paris
2014 in French cinema
2014 film festivals
2014 festivals in Europe